Eli Whitney is an unincorporated community in southeastern Alamance County, North Carolina, United States. It is located at the intersection of North Carolina Highway 87, and Greensboro-Chapel Hill Road. To the south is Mandale and to the west is Snow Camp. The United States Postal Service considers Eli Whitney part of the Graham delivery area.

Eli Whitney gained its name from the inventor of the cotton gin, Eli Whitney. The reasoning for this was because there was once a cotton gin located in the community, but has been gone for many years now. Eli Whitney was once home to a school as well, but it too closed and was later demolished. The school's gymnasium was left standing and now serves as a community center.

External links
 Eli Whitney at the U.S. Geographic Names Information System

Populated places in Alamance County, North Carolina
Unincorporated communities in North Carolina